Black Wings Has My Angel is a noir crime novel by American novelist Elliott Chaze, published by Gold Medal Books in 1953. It centers on an escaped convict, Tim Sunblade, and his plot to rob an armored truck in Denver. At the same time, he is wrapped up in a love/hate relationship with Virginia, a call girl he met in Louisiana.

New editions were published as One for My Money (1962), by Berkley, and as One for the Money (1985), by Robert Hale. In January 2016, the novel was reprinted under its original title by New York Review Classics. It has been described as "a flawless heist novel". A French film adaptation was made in 1990. Work on another, American film began in 2005, but has come to no fruition.

Plot
It is narrated in the first person by escaped convict "Tim Sunblade", who had been convicted of car theft. He is staying at a backwoods Louisiana motel after finishing up a four month stint working on a drilling rig on the Atchafalaya River, when he meets "Virginia", a call girl whom he hires for a night. After spending several days in the motel together, they head out West, with Tim thinking of when and how he is going to ditch her. Circumstances lead the couple, after trying to get away from each other, back together. The two duke it out to get Tim's money, which they have sewn into the panels of a pink girdle.

They settle into a love/hate relationship when Tim realizes that she might be the perfect person to help him pull off a heist. "The novel unfolds from here as the sort of love story in which either lover might turn in or murder the other at any moment until its last desperate pages." The two wind up in Colorado, where Tim discovers a part of Virginia's past and what she is running from in fleeing New York. He lets her in on his plans and they plot to rob an armored truck.

They pretend to be a married couple and buy a house in a suburban part of Denver. Tim gets a job at a factory as a steel cutter. He does his homework on his off time, at a bank, watching the armored truck that rolls in and out of there. One night Tim and Virginia go to a massage parlor, where an old friend Mamie, calls her "Jennie" and talks about how she was a debutante and came from a good family.

After spending weeks waiting for the right opportunity, the couple practice the heist. Tim has studied the armored truck and knows its schedule: the stops it makes, how long the driver and "custodian" (the inside guard) take at each location, and when the truck is most vulnerable to robbery. He eventually steals the truck, killing the custodian, who had sat in back with the money. He takes off while the driver is inside the building and finds Virginia. He drives the truck inside a large trailer they have custom built for the job, using steel from his job. While she drives, towing the trailer, he counts the haul, $89,000. They reach Cripple Creek, a secluded place in the woods where they had previously stayed. They push the armored truck—with the custodian's body still inside—and its trailer into a nearly bottomless mineshaft to hide them. Tim reveals that his account is his confession, as he's writing it in his prison cell.

He recounts that he and Virginia go to New Orleans where they meet Eddie Arceneaux and his sister, Loralee, a couple of young adults from a wealthy family. Tim finds that he and Virginia are becoming the snobbish, rich people types who are buying freely. He believes that Virginia is becoming too spoiled by their new wealth.

Tim runs into former neighbors from his hometown who call him "Kenneth McLure". Eddie says that he is going to seduce Virginia and they will run away together. His sister Loralee tries to seduce Tim; when he returns to his room and finds it empty, he thinks Virginia has gone off with Eddie. Virginia returns alone and Tim forces her to leave New Orleans.

They make their way to the Gulf of Mexico and end up in Tim's hometown of Masonville, Mississippi. After driving by the house of Nona Hickman, an old girlfriend, when they are stopped suddenly by a two police officers. They make a run for it, and start a police chase that ends in Virginia killing the first cop and Tim getting out of the car. She panics and drives off, leaving Tim with the second cop. Tim in defense, shoots and kills him and goes on the run. He is caught and badly beaten, burned with cigars, and thrown in jail. The cops had thought they were suspects in a grocery store robbery. They question him but he refuses to reveal information about Virginia.

Virginia is also caught and thrown in jail. After she seduces and knocks out a jailer, they escape and fly to Denver.

In Colorado, they stay at the hotel in a secluded part where an old mine shaft is. They blend in with the tourists, going skiing and finally renting a house out there. Virginia starts to obsess about death and being in the electric chair. One day, they go out skiing and for a picnic near the mine shaft. They both feel drawn to it, tempted to look inside.

They inch their way towards the open shaft and finally look into the 600-foot drop. Feeling relieved, they start to dance. Virginia suddenly slips and falls into the shaft opening and lands on an unstable rubble outcropping 40 feet down—still alive and screaming. Tim panics and goes back to the hotel to find rope, where he runs into his "old FBI friend", Clell Dooley, who had prosecuted him. Clell notices Tim when he runs out the door to go back to Virginia. When Clell and four or five other men find Tim, he is sitting near the mine shaft, thinking about Virginia. Tim had seen that 40 or so feet down in the mine shaft, there was "a lump", like a rock sticking out and nothing else. Tim asks the men if they have seen Virginia; they carry him off, presumably to jail.

Characters

Reviews
Ed Gorman wrote "Chaze is known in pulp circles for his flawless novel Black Wings Has My Angel, which many people feel is the single best novel Gold Medal published during its heyday." 

In his introduction to the new 2016 edition, screenwriter Barry Gifford wrote, "nothing else Chaze wrote came anywhere close to what he had accomplished on all levels in Black Wings." The book review website The Pequod rated the book a 9.5 (out of 10.0), calling it “a bleak and seedy noir masterpiece… Chaze’s hard-boiled prose is what carries the novel.” In a 2016 retrospective review, Vulture described the book as “a perfect crime novel.”

Bill Pronzini wrote that "Black Wings Has My Angel is a book that must be experienced, not read quickly for casual entertainment. It makes demands on the reader, as any piece of quality fiction does, and those demands deliver hammerblows where other noir novels provide light raps."

Film adaptations
Chaze sold the film rights to French director Jean-Pierre Mocky. Screenwriter Barry Gifford described his 1990 adaptation as "not very good."

In the early 21st century, director Alfonso Pineda Ulloa and producer and co-writer Christopher Peditto spent more than a decade working to obtain the rights to the novel. Peditto and fellow screenwriter Gifford completed a screenplay for the film in 2012, and it was set to star Tom Hiddleston as Tim Sunblade, Anna Paquin as Virginia, and Elijah Wood as Eddie Arceneaux. Filming was scheduled to start in September 2012, but shooting was put on hold after Paquin gave birth to twins and wanted to take time with them. With the loss of major stars' commitments, the project fell apart. Peditto has not officially declared the adaptation will never happen, but, as of summer 2020, he has moved to Sarajevo and is involved in other projects.

Editions
This novel was reprinted in other editions: as One for My Money (1962), Berkley. After Chaze's work was rediscovered in the 1980s, it was reprinted as One for the Money (1985), by Robert Hale. New York Review Classics published a new edition, Black Wings Has My Angel (2016), with an introduction by Barry Gifford.

References

1953 American novels
American thriller novels
American mystery novels
Novels by Elliott Chaze
Gold Medal Books books